"I Say a Little Prayer" is a song written by Burt Bacharach and Hal David for Dionne Warwick, originally peaking at number four on the U.S. Billboard Hot 100 pop singles chart in December 1967.  On the R&B Singles chart it peaked at number eight.

Dionne Warwick original

Intended by lyricist Hal David to convey a woman's concern for her man who's serving in the Vietnam War, "I Say a Little Prayer" was recorded by Dionne Warwick in a 9 April 1966 session. Although Bacharach's recordings with Warwick typically took no more than three takes (often only taking one), Bacharach did ten takes on "I Say a Little Prayer" and still disliked the completed track, feeling it rushed.

The track went unreleased until September 1967, when it was introduced on the album The Windows of the World and it was Scepter Records owner Florence Greenberg rather than Bacharach who wanted "I Say a Little Prayer" added to that album. When disc jockeys from the United States began playing the album track in October 1967, significant air play led Scepter Records to release the track as a single, backed with newly recorded track "(Theme from) Valley of the Dolls".

The brisk sound of "I Say a Little Prayer" that Bacharach disliked proved to be a million-selling hit for Warwick, as "I Say a Little Prayer" reached No. 4 that December on the Billboard Hot 100, No. 8 on the Billboard R&B Chart, No. 4 on the Canadian Chart and No. 3 on the Record World Top 100 Chart. "(Theme from) Valley of the Dolls", the B-side would become another hit for Warwick reaching No. 2 in February 1968 on the Billboard Hot 100 and No. 1 on the Record World Chart: Warwick's "I Say a Little Prayer" single would receive gold certification from the RIAA for sales of a million units in January 1968. "I Say a Little Prayer" b/w "(Theme from) Valley of the Dolls", became one of the most successful double-sided hits of the Rock era. 

Like several Bacharach compositions, both sides contain passages written in unusual time signatures. The verses of "Prayer" are constructed of two successive measures of 4/4, a ten-beat sequence using 4/4 + 4/4 + 2/4, and two final measures of 4/4. The chorus is in  4/4 + 3/4 + 4/4.

Charts

Weekly charts

Year-end charts

Certifications

Aretha Franklin version

"I Say a Little Prayer" also returned to the Pop & R&B Top Ten in the fall of 1968 via a recording by Aretha Franklin taken from her 1968 album Aretha Now.  Franklin and background vocalists The Sweet Inspirations were singing the song for fun while rehearsing the songs intended for the album when the viability of their recording "I Say a Little Prayer" became apparent, significantly reinvented from the format of the Dionne Warwick original via the prominence of Clayton Ivey's piano work.  Similar to the history of Warwick's double-sided hit, the Aretha Franklin version was intended for the B-side of the July 1968 single release "The House That Jack Built" but began to accrue its own airplay that August.

In October 1968 "I Say a Little Prayer" reached number ten on the Hot 100 and number three on the R&B singles chart.  The same month the single was certified Gold by the RIAA. "Prayer" became Franklin's ninth and last consecutive Hot 100 top 10 hit on the Atlantic label. Franklin's "Prayer" has a special significance in her UK career, as with its September 1968 No. 4 peak it became Franklin's biggest UK hit; subsequently Franklin has surpassed that track's UK peak only with her No. 1 collaboration with George Michael, "I Knew You Were Waiting (For Me)".

In February 1987, UK music weekly New Musical Express published its critics' top 150 singles of all time, with Franklin's "I Say a Little Prayer" ranked at No. 1, followed by Al Green's "Tired of Being Alone" and Warwick's "Walk On By". (Franklin's "I Say a Little Prayer" did not appear in the magazine's in-house critics' top 100 singles poll conducted in November 2002.)  In Australia, "I Say a Little Prayer" and "The House That Jack Built" were assigned a joint chart ranking that saw the double-A-side hit reach No. 10 in November 1968. "I Say a Little Prayer" also gave Franklin a European hit with chartings in France (No. 12), West Germany (No. 29) and the Netherlands (No. 4).

There are several harmonic differences between the Warwick and Franklin versions.  Whilst the Warwick original was sung in G major, Franklin's transposes up a tone to A major.  The chord under 'Say a little prayer for…' in the bridge is substantially different (F#m7, or v7 of III, in the original; D, or IV, in Franklin's version) and the third-inversion seventh in the bass under '…and ever…'in the chorus from the original (D major/C#) is a more conventional chord V (E major) in Franklin's arrangement.

In 2021, it was listed at No. 117 on Rolling Stone's "Top 500 Greatest Songs of All Time".

Charts

Weekly charts

Year-end charts

Certifications

Diana King version

In 1997, Jamaican singer Diana King released a reggae-style cover of "I Say a Little Prayer". It was released as the first single from her second album, Think Like a Girl (1997), and also featured prominently in the comedy My Best Friend's Wedding. The Love to Infinity dance remix popularized the song on radio. King's single reached No. 1 in Hungary, No. 6 in Australia, No. 12 in Norway and No. 17 in the UK.

Critical reception
Jose F. Promis from AllMusic called the song "excellent" and "driving". Larry Flick from Billboard described it as a "instantly appealing interpretation", and stated that the song "takes on a saucy and aggressive tone - thanks to the kinetic chemistry between King and producer Andy Marvel, whose beat-smart arrangement gives the kids on the street a reason to pump up the volume." He also complimented British remixers Love to Infinity for doing "a fine job of refashioning the single into a frothy dance ditty, wrapping King's performance in shiny synths and lively beats." The Daily Vault wrote that the Aretha Franklin remake of "I Say a Little Prayer" "is, daresay, better than the original in some respects. King's please-get-lost vocals make for a solid background and power vocals." Pan-European magazine Music & Media noted it as "a '90s version of a '60s standard" and a "reggaefied take on the much covered Burt Bacharach/Hal David tune"."

Charts

Other recordings

Albums and Singles
Warwick's "I Say a Little Prayer" did not appear on the Billboard Easy Listening chart although two instrumental versions of the song were Easy Listening chart items in 1968: the first by Sérgio Mendes at No. 21 in the spring of 1968 while that fall Julius Wechter and the Baja Marimba Band took "I Say a Little Prayer" to No. 10 Easy Listening.

The 1971 album Anne Murray / Glen Campbell features a medley of "I Say a Little Prayer" and "By the Time I Get to Phoenix"; the songs are sung in counterpoint to each other, with Murray vocalizing on  "I Say a Little Prayer" while Campbell reprises his "By the Time I Get to Phoenix" hit. The track was a minor C&W hit at No. 40 and reached No. 81 on the Billboard Hot 100. The concept had previously been used on a 1968 single release by Big Dee Irwin and Mamie Galore and was subsequently reworked when Dionne Warwick herself sang "I Say a Little Prayer" while Isaac Hayes sang "By the Time I Get to Phoenix" on their joint live album A Man and a Woman (1977).

 In Mexico, the song was covered in 1978 by Enrique Guzmán. The version is called "Una pequeña oración".
 In 1978, Spanish singer Paloma San Basilio performed this song for her live album Paloma San Basilio en directo.
 UK dance act Bomb the Bass (featuring Maureen) in 1988, which peaked at No. 10 in the UK Singles Chart.
 British Britpop band Gene recorded a live cover at Glastonbury, which was released on their compilation album To See the Lights.
 Japanese band Ground Zero covered the Rahsaan Roland Kirk cover version of this song on their 1997 album Plays Standards.
 Canadian electronic music duo Zeds Dead sampled this song for their track titled "Coffee Break" in 2011.
 Lianne La Havas released a live version as a single on 2016.

Film, TV, and Musical soundtracks
The song is also a popular soundtrack item: in the 1969 comedy The April Fools, for which Warwick sang the title song, "I Say a Little Prayer" is performed at a Manhattan luxury apartment party in a live performance by singer Susan Barrett.

In 1997, "I Say a Little Prayer" is one of several Bacharach/David songs featured prominently in the comedy My Best Friend's Wedding, which featured both a reggae-style cover by Diana King and a version sung by the film's cast. King's version was released as a single and brought the song back to the Top 40 almost thirty years after Dionne Warwick's original, albeit with a No. 38 peak; King's single also reached No. 1 in Hungary, No. 34 in France, and No. 6 in Australia, where the film's soundtrack was a No. 1 album. Cassie Henderson, 14, sung this song for Soul Week on The X-Factor NZ Season 1 Episode 16. A parody of the song with altered lyrics was featured in the 2006 comedy film Date Movie making fun of its use in My Best Friend's Wedding. 

It was covered and used in the television show Glee, in the episode "Showmance". It was performed by Dianna Agron as her character Quinn Fabray, with Naya Rivera and Heather Morris dancing backup as Santana Lopez and Brittany Pierce, as their audition song to join the glee club. Agron's "I Say a Little Prayer" charted on the UK Singles Chart at number 125. By 2020, recreating the choreographed dance from the episode, to Agron's cover, had become an internet meme popular on TikTok.

The song was used in the 2010 revival of Promises, Promises. In 2011, the song was also included in the Broadway Musical "The Adventures of Priscilla, Queen of The Desert".

 Karine Costa in 2002: a No. 16 hit in France that also charted on the Swiss charts at No. 82; this version was used in a television advertising campaign for the Crédit mutuel.
 The BossHoss in 2006: a minor German hit (No. 79). In 2012, the group re-recorded this song as a collaboration with Ivy Quainoo, the first winner of The Voice of Germany.
 Tori Kelly and Pharrell Williams (as their characters Meena and Alfonso) covered this song for the 2021 animated movie Sing 2.
 Little Mix's Leigh-Anne Pinnock covered a slowed down version of this song for her debut movie Boxing Day.

See also
"I Sign a Little Player or Two" (2006), a parody of both the song and José Mourinho, at the time manager of Chelsea F.C.
"(Theme from) Valley of the Dolls", the B side to "I Say a Little Prayer". The k.d. lang cover of "(Theme from) The Valley of the Dolls" by Dionne Warwick (from the 1967 motion picture Valley of the Dolls) was used in several scenes from the Showtime original series Nurse Jackie (2009-2015). "I Say a Little Prayer" was the title of the series finale episode, which also included k.d. lang's "(Theme from) The Valley of the Dolls".

References

External links
 
 

1967 singles
1968 singles
1971 singles
1997 singles
Songs with lyrics by Hal David
Songs with music by Burt Bacharach
Dionne Warwick songs
Aretha Franklin songs
Anne Murray songs
Glen Campbell songs
Diana King songs
Adriano Celentano songs
Number-one singles in Hungary
1967 songs
Scepter Records singles
Atlantic Records singles